Vice Admiral Rustom Khushro Shapur 'Rusi' Ghandhi, PVSM, VrC (1 July 1924 – 23 December 2014) was a former flag officer in the Indian Navy. He last served as the Flag Officer Commanding-in-Chief Western Naval Command from 1977 to 1979. He is the only officer to have commanded ships in all wars and conflicts post Independence. He commanded the frigate  during the Annexation of Goa, the destroyer  during the Indo-Pakistani War of 1965 and the cruiser  during the Indo-Pakistani War of 1971.

After he retired from the Indian Navy in 1979, he served as the Chairman of the Shipping Corporation of India. In 1986, he was appointed the fifth Governor of Himachal Pradesh. After the National Commission for Minorities was created, he served as a member of the commission.

Early life and education
Ghandhi was the son of Khushro Shapur Ghandhi and Dina Dhunji Shah Amroliwalah. He was born in 1924 in Jabalpur, India. He graduated from St. Joseph's College, Nainital, India, with an Intermediate Science degree in 1941. After a year of advanced studies at Allahabad University, he subsequently joined the Royal Indian Navy with a permanent commission as an officer cadet on 1 January 1943.

Naval career

Early career
Ghandhi was promoted to midshipman on 1 September 1943. He served aboard the County-class cruiser . The Suffolk was deployed in the Atlantic hunting German raiders. He then served on board the W-class destroyer  when it was deployed against the Japanese refineries in Indonesia. On 1 May 1945, he was promoted to Acting sub-lieutenant. He was in Tokyo Bay during the Surrender of Japan.

After the war, he returned to India and was appointed Flag lieutenant to the Commander-in-Chief, Royal Indian Navy Vice Admiral Sir Geoffrey Audley Miles. In February 1947, Lord Louis Mountbatten was appointed Governor-General of India. Ghandhi was appointed aide-de-camp (ADC) to the Governor-General.

Post-Independence
As the ADC, Ghandhi was present with the Governor-General Mountbatten at Viceroy's House on 15 August 1947 when India's independence was declared. He was promoted to acting lieutenant-commander on 30 June 1952, and in mid-1954 was selected to attend the Defence Services Staff College, Wellington. In 1957, he was appointed commanding officer of the Black Swan-class sloop INS Kaveri. He was promoted to commander on 31 December 1958.

Liberation of Goa
He was in command of the Betwa and played a decisive role in "Operation Vijay", the 1961 Indian annexation of Goa which ended 451 years of Portuguese rule. Betwa was the senior ship during the naval battle at Mormugão Harbour. His Portuguese adversary, Captain António da Cunha Aragão, was in command of the destroyer , which was anchored off Mormugão Harbour.

In the ensuing battle, the Afonso de Albuquerque took a direct hit to its control tower, injuring its weapons officer, killing its radio officer and severely injuring its captain. Subsequently, the order was given to abandon ship, and the rest of the crew, along with their injured captain, disembarked directly onto the beach after setting fire to their ship. Following this, the captain was moved by car to the hospital at Panaji. The destroyer's crew surrendered formally along with the remaining Portuguese forces on 19 December 1961. As a gesture of goodwill, the commanders of INS Betwa and INS Beas later visited Captain Aragão as he lay recuperating in bed at Panjim, and presented him with a gift of brandy, chocolates, and dried fruit, since it was just before Christmas. In return, Captain Aragão gave Commander Ghandhi the keys to his cabin as a token of surrender. Commander Ghandhi also sent messages via England to inform Portugal that Captain Aragão was well.

Ghandhi was in command of the frigate for about two years, after which he was selected to attend the Naval War College in Newport, Rhode Island. After completing the course, he returned to India and was promoted to the acting rank of Captain, on 31 August 1964. While in command of the squadron, he was promoted to the substantive rank of captain on 31 December 1966. In August 1967, he was selected to attend the National Defence College. The year-long course commenced in January 1968. After completing the course, Ghandhi moved to Naval HQ, having been appointed Director of Naval Operations.

Indo-Pakistani War of 1971
At the outbreak of war, the Western Fleet was commanded by Rear Admiral Elenjikal Chandy Kuruvila. INS Mysore thus became the flagship of the Western Fleet.
Ghandhi was awarded the Vir Chakra for conspicuous gallantry for his role as flag captain of the western fleet. After the war, Ghandhi was appointed Naval Advisor (NA) to the High Commissioner of India to the United Kingdom at India House, London. The High Commissioners were Apa Pant and Braj Kumar Nehru during his tenure.

Flag rank
After a two year stint as NA in London, he was promoted to the acting rank of Rear Admiral and appointed Flag Officer Commanding Eastern Fleet in January 1975. In October of the same year, he moved to Mumbai and took command of the Western Fleet. He is the only officer to have commanded both fleets of the Indian Navy.

In February 1976, Ghandhi relinquished command of the western fleet, handing over to Rear Admiral M. R. Schunker. He was promoted to the acting rank of Vice Admiral and moved to Naval HQ as Chief of Personnel (COP). On 26 January 1977, he was awarded the Param Vishisht Seva Medal for distinguished service of the most exceptional order. After a year as COP, in April 1977, he was appointed Flag Officer Commanding-in-Chief Western Naval Command.

Post-retirement
Upon retirement from the Indian Navy, Ghandhi enjoyed a short stint as technical consultant for the motion picture The Sea Wolves, and played a cameo role as the Governor of Goa in it. He served as the Captain Commandant of the executive branch till 1984, handing over to Vice Admiral Mihir K. Roy. He was appointed Chairman of the Shipping Corporation of India in 1981 and served in that capacity until 1986.

Political career
From April 1986 to February 1990, while Rajiv Gandhi was Prime Minister of India, Vice Admiral Ghandhi served as Governor of the State of Himachal Pradesh, residing with Mrs. Ghandhi at Raj Bhavan in Shimla. In addition to governmental duties, Vice Admiral and Mrs. Ghandhi made many improvements to Raj Bhavan, including a complete restoration of the billiard room and the Durbar Hall, as well as the construction of a gazebo on the premises.  Following his governorship, Vice Admiral Ghandhi served as a Member of the National Commission for Minorities from 1993 to 1996.

Personal life
He was married to Khorshed "Bubbles" Kharegat (deceased 2011), daughter of Sir Peroz and Lady Kharegat, née Dadabhoy, on 1 January 1949, and had three children, Sandy, Yasmine and Delna. He was the oldest of five brothers, the others being Dhun, Sorab, Burz and Jamshed.

Death
Admiral Ghandhi died peacefully in his home in Navy Nagar of Colaba, Mumbai on 23 December 2014, aged 90, and was buried in the Arabian Sea on 27 December 2014 from INS Vipul.

References 

1924 births
2014 deaths
Royal Navy officers
Parsi people
People from Jabalpur
University of Allahabad alumni
Indian Navy admirals
Chiefs of Personnel (India)
Flag Officers Commanding Western Fleet
Flag Officers Commanding Eastern Fleet
Recipients of the Vir Chakra
Governors of Himachal Pradesh
Royal Indian Navy officers
National Defence College, India alumni
Naval War College alumni
Recipients of the Param Vishisht Seva Medal
Indian naval attachés